Leptophlebia wui is a species of pronggill mayfly in the family Leptophlebiidae.

References

Mayflies
Articles created by Qbugbot
Insects described in 1936